The paired (right and left) fronto-polar thalamic veins originate each on the corresponding frontal polus of the thalamus and drain its anterior portion. Benno Shlesinger in 1976 classified these veins as belonging to the central group of thalamic veins.

References 

Thalamic veins